Beta-secretase 2 (also known as Memapsin-1) is an enzyme that cleaves Glu-Val-Asn-Leu!Asp-Ala-Glu-Phe in the Swedish variant of Alzheimer's amyloid precursor protein. BACE2 is a close homolog of BACE1.

Function 

Cerebral deposition of amyloid beta peptide is an early and critical feature of Alzheimer's disease and a frequent complication of Down syndrome. Amyloid beta peptide is generated by proteolytic cleavage of amyloid precursor protein by 2 proteases, one of which is the protein encoded by this gene. This gene localizes to the 'Down critical region' of chromosome 21. The encoded protein, a member of the peptidase A1 protein family, is a type I integral membrane glycoprotein and aspartic protease. Three transcript variants encoding different isoforms have been described for this gene.
It has been reported that BACE2 is the main protease that mediates the release of the amyloidogenic ectodomain of Pmel17 in melanocytes. 
 BACE2 has also been observed in mice to be correlated with maintaining the pancreatic β cells and improving control of glucose homeostasis, which may prove to be useful for research on Type 2 Diabetes.

Interactions 

BACE2 has been shown to interact with GGA1 and GGA2.

References

Further reading

External links 
 https://web.archive.org/web/20070318110931/http://www.ihop-net.org/UniPub/iHOP/gs/129262.html
 
 

EC 3.4.23